Afton Alps is a ski area, which hosts a collection of ski and snowboard trails, located along the St. Croix River in the northeast corner of Denmark Township, Washington County, south of Afton, Minnesota in the United States.  There are nearly  skiable at Afton Alps.  The ski hill has  of vertical drop. The Alps utilizes an extensive snowmaking system for maintaining the slopes during the winter months.  There are a total of 36 trails with 17 chairlifts, two conveyor lifts, and a double-sided rope tow in the Landing Zone Terrain Park.  There are five chalets, including the Meadows Chalet, the Highlands Chalet, the Alpine Chalet, Landing Zone (also has a Yurt) and the Alps Chalet (Main Chalet). Afton Alps' winter season runs mid-November through mid-March.

On December 6, 2012 it was announced that Afton Alps has been sold to Vail Resorts of Colorado.

Activities

The following are activities included at Afton Alps:
 Alpine skiing
 Night skiing
 Snowboarding

External links
 Afton Alps Homepage

References

The City of Afton
Afton Alps
On The Snow
Afton Alps stats
Hudson WI Patch article St. Croix Valley ski history

Ski areas and resorts in Minnesota
Buildings and structures in Washington County, Minnesota
Tourist attractions in Washington County, Minnesota
Vail Resorts